Liga Deportiva Universitaria de Quito's 1994 season was the club's 64th year of existence, the 41st year in professional football, and the 34th in the top level of professional football in Ecuador.

Kits
Supplier: DideSponsor(s): Orangine, Almacenes Rickie

Squad

Competitions

Serie A

First stage

Results

Second stage

Note: Intergroups match (LDU Quito - D. Cuenca)

Results

External links

RSSSF - 1994 Serie A 

1994